The 1933 North Carolina Tar Heels football team represented the University of North Carolina at Chapel Hill during the 1933 college football season. The Tar Heels were led by eighth-year head coach Chuck Collins and played their home games at Kenan Memorial Stadium. They competed as a member of the Southern Conference. Collins' coaching contract expired at the conclusion of the season, and UNC elected not to renew his contract, citing lack of success on the field. He was 38–31–9 in his eight seasons as head coach.

Schedule

References

North Carolina
North Carolina Tar Heels football seasons
North Carolina Tar Heels football